Parrhasius urraca is a butterfly of the family Lycaenidae. It was described by Stanley S. Nicolay in 1979. It is found in Panama.

References

Butterflies described in 1979
Eumaeini